The Mongol United Autonomous Government was a Japanese puppet regime in Inner Mongolia from 1937 to 1939.

History 
Following the Marco Polo Bridge Incident, Japanese troops were eager to sent troops into Inner Mongolia, and on October 14th, 1937, the Japanese captured Hohhot and October 17th, Baotou. On October 27th, the 2nd Mongol Conference was held in Hohhot with the assistance of Japan, and the Mongol United Autonomous Government was established on the 28th along with the Inner Mongolian Interim Law, the Inner Mongolian Autonomous Government Referendum, and the election of Yondonwangchug as chairman of the government.

Along with other puppet governments in Mongolia, like the autonomous governments of South Chahar and North Shanxi, established the Mongolian-Jiangsu Joint Committee to administer general affairs within Inner Mongolia and Shanxi. On September 1st, 1939, the governments went a step further by establishing the Mengjiang government.

Organization 
The Mongol United Autonomous Government was established in Hohhot with a chairman and vice chairman; "the chairman is the sovereign of the Mongol United Autonomous Government; in case of an incident, the chairman will act on his behalf". There was also the Governmental Council responsible for all administrations. The State Council included the Ministry of General Affairs, the Ministry of Finance, and the Ministry of Security, each with several smaller departments.

The subdivisions of the Mongol United Autonomous Government, under the jurisdiction of the Council of State Affairs, were the Ulan Chabu League, the Yikezhao League, the Chahar League, Bayantala League (established later on), and the Xilin Gol League, along with the municipal offices of Hohhot and Baotou. Each league office had one league leader, one deputy leader, and one Japanese participating official.

See also 

 Mengjiang
 North Shanxi Autonomous Government
 South Chahar Autonomous Government

References 



States and territories disestablished in 1939
Client states of the Empire of Japan
Mengjiang
Former countries in East Asia
States and territories established in 1937
Axis powers
Japan–Mongolia relations
Mongol collaborators with Imperial Japan
History of Inner Mongolia